The World Polonia Games are a multi-sport event held annually for the Polish diaspora (Polonia) and Polish minorities living outside of Poland. Alternating between summer and winter games each year, the first edition of the games were held in Warsaw in 1934, and they have been played regularly since their revival in 1974. The games are organized by the Association "Polish Community" and are covered by TVP Polonia.

This article lists the records set at the World Polonia Games in athletics and swimming between 1934 and 2021.

Athletics

Men

Women

Swimming

Men

Women

See also 
 World Polonia Games

References 

Polish diaspora
Sport in Poland